Legislative Assembly elections were held in the Indian state of Rajasthan in 1993. The Bharatiya Janata Party and Indian National Congress emerged as the two major political parties in this election.

Results

List of winners

References

State Assembly elections in Rajasthan
Rajasthan